The Sheikh San'ani Brigade was a highly trained Somali National Movement infantry which had a leading role in the Somaliland War of Independence .

Legacy 
The Brigade under the leadership of Sultan Mohamed Sultan Farah led Somaliland's demobilization and disarmament process. In February 1994, the SNM unit was first to hand over its weapons to the government and become absorbed into the Somaliland Armed Forces.

References

1988 in Somalia
1991 in Somaliland
Somali National Movement
Somaliland Declaration of Independence